Zarak Jahan Khan also spelled Zarak Jehan Khan (1 February 1967, Quetta) is a Pakistani Asian Games gold medallist in squash.

His brothers are Hiddy Jahan and Zubair Jahan Khan also both successful professional squash players on the international circuit.
His son is Shahjahan Khan, squash professional coached by his father on the international circuit.

Career

Khan represented Pakistan during the 1989 Men's World Team Squash Championships winning a silver medal and four years later he was part of the winning team at the 1993 Men's World Team Squash Championships.
He also won the individual title at the 1998 Asian Games in Bangkok, Thailand. 
His highest world Ranking was 8 (March 1994).
Right now (2011), he is working as coach at Cross Courts in Natick, MA. Previously he was at the Seattle Athletic Club, Seattle, United States.

References

Pakistani male squash players
1967 births
Living people
Asian Games gold medalists for Pakistan
People from Quetta District
Asian Games medalists in squash
Squash players at the 1998 Asian Games
Medalists at the 1998 Asian Games